Christ Carrying the Cross refers to Jesus's journey to his crucifixion.

Christ Carrying the Cross may also refer to:

Paintings
 Christ Carrying the Cross (Bosch, Ghent), early 16th century, attributed to a follower of Hieronymus Bosch, now in the Museum of Fine Arts
 Christ Carrying the Cross (Bosch, Madrid), 1505–07, by Hieronymus Bosch, now in the Royal Palace of Madrid
 Christ Carrying the Cross (Bosch, Vienna), 1480s, by Hieronymus Bosch, now at the Kunsthistorisches Museum
 Christ Carrying the Cross (El Greco, Barcelona), 1590–1595, now in the Museu Nacional d'Art de Catalunya
 Christ Carrying the Cross (El Greco, Madrid), 1597–1600, now in the Museo del Prado
 Christ Carrying the Cross (El Greco, New York), 1580, now in the Metropolitan Museum of Art
 Christ Carrying the Cross (Lotto), 1526, by Lorenzo Lotto, now in the Louvre, Paris
 Christ Carrying the Cross (Titian), 1505, attributed to Titian or Giorgione, now in the Scuola Grande di San Rocco, Venice

See also
 Christ Falling on the Way to Calvary, a c.1514–16 painting by Raphael, now in the Museo del Prado, Madrid
 Risen Christ (Michelangelo, Santa Maria sopra Minerva) or Christ Carrying the Cross, a 1521 marble sculpture by Michelangelo
 The Procession to Calvary (Bruegel), a 1564 painting by Pieter Bruegel the Elder, now in the Kunsthistorisches Museum, Vienna